Soccer Slammers is a soccer video game developed and published by Atooi. It was released in June 2018 for the Nintendo Switch prior to the 2018 FIFA World Cup.

Gameplay
The game is an arcade-styled soccer video game; unlike the FIFA series of soccer video games, which focus on realism in gameplay and presentation, Soccer Slam features exaggerated and simplified gameplay, similar to NBA Jam's take on basketball.
 The game features two versus two gameplay with short, pixelated fictional characters in the art style of Minecraft. The game features local multiplayer with up to four players.

Development
The game was first announced in late January 2018. The game is being developed by Atooi, the company formed by Jools Watsham after the dissolution of his prior co-founded company - Renegade Kid. Watsham described the game as being heavily influenced from NBA Jam. The game made its first appearance at Game Developers Conference in March 2018. The game was initially planned to have video capturing features at releases, but the feature was delayed into plans for a future free downloadable content (DLC) pack after release, due to technical problems outside of the developer's control. The game is scheduled for release prior to the 2018 FIFA World Cup in July. The game was submitted to Nintendo for approval for release on the Nintendo Switch eShop in May 2018.

Reception
Pocket Gamer criticized the game's simplicity, randomness, and lack of things to do in the game, comparing it unfavorably to the type of soccer games that had been made for the Sega Game Gear.

References

External links
 

2018 video games
Nintendo Switch games
Nintendo Switch-only games
Street football video games
Multiplayer and single-player video games
Video games developed in the United States